David Arconti (born September 22, 1986) is an American politician who has served in the Connecticut House of Representatives from the 109th district since 2013.

References

1986 births
Living people
Politicians from Danbury, Connecticut
Democratic Party members of the Connecticut House of Representatives
21st-century American politicians